Stacey Thomson (born 27 August 1964) is an Australian television presenter.

Career 
Thomson is a host on the long-running nature and science themed series Totally Wild and has been with the show since its premiere in 1992. She is often introduced as Ranger Stacey.

Formerly a ranger and spokeswoman for the Queensland Parks and Wildlife Service, Thomson has also appeared on Celebrity Big Brother, Wombat, Agro's Cartoon Connection, Rove Live and Celebrity Name Game.

In 2017, Stacey celebrated 25 years of Totally Wild.

References

External links
 

Living people
Australian veterinarians
Women veterinarians
1964 births
Australian children's television presenters
Australian women television presenters